Kekoo Lotpee (English: Hide and Seek)  is a 2008 Indian Meitei language film directed by Homen D' Wai and produced by Homen Rajkumar, under the banner of Treasure Island. It stars Lairenjam Olen, Kamala Saikhom and Ngangbi in the lead roles. Olen is spotted with a big moustache in the film.

Synopsis
In the conflict torn state of Manipur, Manglembi's family finds no good ground for a better future as frightening events unfolds one after another. Her brother Lanjenba, a journalist who exercises maximum power of the pen, suffers too but he never loses his heart to stand for truth. The never ending game of hide and seek plays out in the state. But truth prevails and Lanjenba wins.

Cast
 Lairenjam Olen as Lanjenba
 Kamala Saikhom as Lawyer
 Ngangbi as Manglembi
 Thingom Pritam as Sakhen
 Rina as Shanti
 Aruna as Memthoi
 Benu
 Tayenjam Mema as Shopkeeper
 Irom Shyamkishore
 Ibomcha as Pump attendant
 Philem Puneshori as Manglembi's local sister
 Rangilal as Government school teacher

Soundtrack
Gotimayum Surchandra Sharma composed the soundtrack for the movie. B. Jayantakumar Sharma and Homen D' Wai wrote the lyrics. The movie has three songs. Ita Thaomei and Pebet are animated and based on the popular folk tales of Manipur.

References

Meitei-language films
2008 films